The Delegation of the European Union to the United States represents the European Union in the United States, working in coordination with the diplomatic and consular missions of all the EU Member States. It is located at 2175 K Street, N.W., in the West End neighborhood of Washington, D.C.

Since March 2019, the Ambassador of the EU Delegation has been Stavros Lambrinidis.

Role
The Delegation of the European Union presents and explains EU policy to both the U.S. administration and Congress. The Delegation also analyzes and reports on the political, social, and economic situation in the U.S., and acts as a liaison with other international organizations in Washington, D.C. Through its engagement with political actors, the media, academia, business circles, and civil society, the Delegation raises awareness of EU issues and concerns, and promotes the EU-U.S. relationship among the broader American public.

The Delegation represents the EU in matters where the Member States have agreed that their interests be represented collectively, for example, in areas of customs and trade. In contrast, the Embassy of each EU Member State represents the bilateral interests of that nation in its dealings with the U.S. government, and in areas that are not under specific EU jurisdiction. All consular affairs are dealt with by individual Member States. The Delegation also sponsors the European Union Centers of Excellence, a network of university programs dedicated to the study of the EU.

History
The European Union has had a permanent presence in Washington, D.C. since 1954, which served as the EU's first overseas representation. Since 1964, the EU has also maintained an office in New York, which now serves as the EU Delegation to the United Nations.

Precedence
At diplomatic events, the EU ambassadorship previously followed national ambassadorships; i.e., it sat "on par with the African Union", which is also not a country. In 2016, the Obama administration promoted the EU precedence to country-level (but only the Europeans, and not any other non-nations). In 2018, the Department of State returned the EU ambassadorship to non-country level, "back alongside the African Union." Jan Ehler, from Germany, Chairman of the EU parliamentary Delegation for Relations with the United States, complained of the EU being relegated to "the bottom of the list." In March 2019, the Department of State restored the diplomatic status of the European Union back to the pre-2018 status reflecting the EU's status "as equivalent to that of a bilateral mission in the Diplomatic Corps Order of Precedence."

Ambassadors

Among the Delegation's former Ambassadors, three also served as his country's prime minister: Jens Otto Krag, Dries van Agt, and John Bruton.

Stavros Lambrinidis – March 2019 to Present
David O'Sullivan – November 2014 to March 2019
João Vale de Almeida – February 2010 to November 2014
Angelos Pangratis (acting) – October 2009 to February 2010
John Bruton (former Irish Taoiseach) – November 2004 to October 2009
Günter Burghardt – January 2000 to November 2004
Hugo Paemen – 1995 to 1999
Dries van Agt (former Prime Minister of the Netherlands) – 1989 to 1995
Sir Roy Denman – 1982 to 1989
Roland de Kergorlay – 1981 to 1982
Fernand Spaak (son of Paul-Henri Spaak and first EC civil servant to the post) – 1977 to 1981
Jens Otto Krag (former Prime Minister of Denmark) – 1974 to 1977
Aldo Mario Mazio (first titled Ambassador and received diplomatic recognition) – 1971 to 1974

Embassy Sections
Head/Deputy Head of Delegation
 Serves as official representative of the EU to the U.S.

Administration
 Provides support services for the Delegation staff, building and residences
 Consults with authorities in the European Commission and the U.S. on all protocol and administrative matters related to EU officials

Economic & Financial Affairs
 Monitors and assesses U.S. economic performance
 Liaises with U.S. authorities dealing with economic, financial, and monetary issues
 Corresponds with the International Monetary Fund, World Bank and Multilateral Development Banks in areas of interest to the EU

Food Safety, Health & Consumer Affairs
 Facilitates relations with the U.S. administration, U.S. Congress, industry and consumers in the above-mentioned areas

Political, Security & Development
 Maintains contact with the U.S. administration and Congress on foreign, security, and development policy, counter-terrorism, justice and home affairs, and issues relating to human rights

Press & Public Diplomacy
 Focuses on raising awareness of the EU in the U.S.
 Maintains contact with U.S. media outlets and provides them with information and analyses of EU developments, positions, and statistics
 Offers outreach grants for universities, think tanks, and NGOs
 Produces and distributes information materials, maintains the Delegation's website, and deals with public inquiries
 Organizes speaking tours and cultural events

Science, Technology & Education
 Maintains relations with U.S. authorities at the Federal and State levels, research universities, national laboratories and the high tech industry
 Processes information for the European Commission in Brussels and Luxembourg pertaining to trends in science, technology, and education

Trade & Agriculture
 Monitors trade and regulatory developments in the U.S.
 Maintains relations with the U.S. administration, Congress, and NGOs

Transport, Energy, Environment & Nuclear Matters
 Analyzes U.S. political, economic and regulatory developments in the areas of transportation, energy, and environment

Staff
Ambassador Stavros Lambrinidis the Head of the Delegation of the European Union to the United States. In this capacity, he represents European Commission President Ursula von der Leyen and President of the European Council Charles Michel, under the authority of the High Representative of the European Union for Foreign Affairs and Security Policy Josep Borrell. As of 2011, the Delegation has approximately 80 permanent staff members, including 30 officials.

Building
On September 29, 2010, EU High Representative for Foreign Affairs and Security Policy and Vice President of the European Commission Catherine Ashton inaugurated the current EU Delegation to the United States. The Delegation building was granted LEED Gold status by the U.S. Green Building Council.

See also
 United States–European Union relations
 European Union Ambassador
 United States Mission to the European Union
 List of diplomatic missions of the European Union
 European External Action Service
 European Parliament Liaison Office with the US Congress

References

External links
 Official Site

Eur
Washington, D.C.
 
European Union
United States
United States–European Union relations